Yuri Vladimirovich Linnik (January 8, 1915 – June 30, 1972) was a Soviet mathematician active in number theory, probability theory and mathematical statistics.

Linnik was born in Bila Tserkva, in present-day Ukraine.  He went to St Petersburg University where his supervisor was Vladimir Tartakovski, and later worked at that university and the Steklov Institute.  He was a member of the Russian Academy of Sciences, as was his father, Vladimir Pavlovich Linnik.  He was awarded both State and Lenin Prizes.  He died in Leningrad.

Work in number theory

 Linnik's theorem in analytic number theory
 The dispersion method (which allowed him to solve the Titchmarsh problem).
 The large sieve (which turned out to be extremely influential).
 An elementary proof of the Hilbert-Waring theorem; see also Schnirelmann density.
 The Linnik ergodic method, see , which allowed him to study the distribution properties of the representations of integers by integral ternary quadratic forms.

Work in probability theory and statistics

Infinitely divisible distributions

Linnik obtained numerous results concerning infinitely divisible distributions. In particular, he proved the following generalisation of Cramér's theorem: any divisor of a convolution of Gaussian and Poisson random variables is also a convolution of Gaussian and Poisson.

He has also coauthored the book  on the arithmetics of infinitely divisible distributions.

Central limit theorem
 Linnik zones (zones of asymptotic normality)
 Information-theoretic proof of the central limit theorem

Statistics
 Behrens–Fisher problem

Selected publications

Notes

External links

Acta Arithmetica: Linnik memorial issue (1975)
List of books by Linnik provided by National Library of Australia

1915 births
1972 deaths
20th-century Russian mathematicians
Soviet mathematicians
Number theorists
Full Members of the USSR Academy of Sciences
Heroes of Socialist Labour
Russian statisticians
Members of the Royal Swedish Academy of Sciences